Anwar Abdul Ghanee (born 17 September 1980) is a former Maldivian footballer.

Club career
Anwar started his career, playing for Club Valencia, alongside his elder brother Assad and Akram. He suffered a serious knee injury, playing for Valencia in the season opening match of 2005 against New Radiant.

In 2006, he transferred to Victory Sports Club then to New Radiant in 2007.

Anwar agreed to sign for Vyansa in the 2008 season, when the club agreed to give free medical treatments to his injured knee. He played a season with Vyansa and moved to VB Sports Club in 2009, where he continued to play until retirement.

International career
Anwar played for the Maldives national football team alongside his elder brother Assad Abdul Ghanee. He was first called up for the senior national team side in 2003, and he has represented Maldives in FIFA World Cup qualification matches.

Personal life
Anwar is the younger brother of the retired former Maldives national football team captain Assad Abdul Ghanee, and elder brother of New Radiant player Akram Abdul Ghanee.

References

External links 

1980 births
Living people
Maldivian footballers
Maldives international footballers
Club Valencia players
New Radiant S.C. players
Victory Sports Club players
Footballers at the 2002 Asian Games
Association football defenders
Asian Games competitors for the Maldives